Canthigaster is a genus in the pufferfish family (Tetraodontidae). A fish from this genus is sometimes referred to as a "toby" (a generally accepted name that originated in Australia) or a "sharpnose puffer".

Species
There are currently 37 recognized species in this genus:
 Canthigaster amboinensis (Bleeker, 1865) (Spider-eye puffer)

 Canthigaster axiologus Whitley, 1931 (Pacific crown toby)
Canthigaster aziz Matsuura, Bogorodsky, Mal & Alpermann 2020 (Aziz's toby)
 Canthigaster bennetti (Bleeker, 1854) (Bennett's sharpnose puffer)
 Canthigaster callisterna (J. D. Ogilby, 1889) (Clown toado)
 Canthigaster capistrata (R. T. Lowe, 1839) (Macaronesian sharpnose-puffer)
 Canthigaster compressa (Marion de Procé, 1822) (Compressed toby)
 Canthigaster coronata (Vaillant & Sauvage, 1875) (Crowned puffer)
 Canthigaster criobe J. T. Williams, Delrieu-Trottin & Planes, 2012 (Striped toby)
 Canthigaster cyanetron J. E. Randall & Cea Egaña, 1989
 Canthigaster cyanospilota J. E. Randall, J. T. Williams & L. A. Rocha, 2008
 Canthigaster epilampra (O. P. Jenkins, 1903) (Lantern toby)
 Canthigaster figueiredoi R. L. Moura & R. M. C. Castro, 2002 (Southern Atlantic sharpnose-puffer)
 Canthigaster flavoreticulata Matsuura, 1986
 Canthigaster inframacula G. R. Allen & J. E. Randall, 1977
 Canthigaster investigatoris (Annandale & J. T. Jenkins, 1910)
 Canthigaster jactator (O. P. Jenkins, 1901) (Hawaiian whitespotted toby)
 Canthigaster jamestyleri R. L. Moura & R. M. C. Castro, 2002 (Goldface toby)
 Canthigaster janthinoptera (Bleeker, 1855) (Honeycomb toby)
 Canthigaster leoparda Lubbock & G. R. Allen, 1979 (Leopard sharpnose puffer)
 Canthigaster margaritata (Rüppell, 1829) (Pearl toby)
 Canthigaster marquesensis G. R. Allen & J. E. Randall, 1977
 Canthigaster natalensis (Günther, 1870) (Natal toby)

 Canthigaster ocellicincta G. R. Allen & J. E. Randall, 1977 (Shy toby)
 Canthigaster papua (Bleeker, 1848) (Papuan toby)
 Canthigaster punctata Matsuura, 1992
 Canthigaster punctatissima (Günther, 1870) (Spotted sharpnosed puffer)
 Canthigaster pygmaea G. R. Allen & J. E. Randall, 1977 (Pygmy toby)
 Canthigaster rapaensis G. R. Allen & J. E. Randall, 1977
 Canthigaster rivulata (Temminck & Schlegel, 1850) (Brown-lined puffer)
 Canthigaster rostrata (Bloch, 1786) (Caribbean sharpnose-puffer)
 Canthigaster sanctaehelenae (Günther, 1870) (St. Helena sharpnose pufferfish)
 Canthigaster smithae G. R. Allen & J. E. Randall, 1977 (Bicolored toby)
 Canthigaster solandri (Richardson, 1845) (Spotted sharpnose)
 Canthigaster supramacula R. L. Moura & R. M. C. Castro, 2002 (West African sharpnose-puffer)
 Canthigaster tyleri G. R. Allen & J. E. Randall, 1977 (Tyler's toby)
 Canthigaster valentini (Bleeker, 1853) (Valentinni's sharpnose puffer)

References

 
Tetraodontidae
Marine fish genera
Taxa named by William John Swainson